HERA was a particle accelerator at DESY in Hamburg. It began operating in 1992. At HERA, electrons or positrons were collided with protons at a center of mass energy of 318 GeV. It was the only lepton-proton collider in the world while operating. Also, it was on the energy frontier in certain regions of the kinematic range. HERA was closed down on 30 June 2007.

The HERA tunnel is located under the DESY site and the nearby Volkspark around 15 to 30 m underground and has a circumference of 6.3 km. Leptons and protons were stored in two independent storage rings on top of each other inside this tunnel.
There are four interaction regions, which were used by the experiments H1, ZEUS, HERMES and HERA-B. All these experiments were particle detectors.

Leptons (electrons or positrons) were pre-accelerated to 450 MeV in the linear accelerator LINAC-II. From there they were injected into the storage ring DESY-II and accelerated further to 7.5 GeV before their transfer into PETRA, where they were accelerated to 14 GeV. Finally they were injected into their storage ring in the HERA tunnel and reached a final energy of 27.5 GeV. This storage ring was equipped with warm (non-superconducting) magnets keeping the leptons on their circular track by a magnetic field of 0.17 Tesla.

Protons were obtained from originally negatively charged hydrogen ions and pre-accelerated to 50 MeV in a linear accelerator. They were then injected into the proton synchrotron DESY-III and accelerated further to 7 GeV. Then they were transferred to PETRA, where they were accelerated to 40 GeV. Finally, they were injected into their storage ring in the HERA tunnel and reached their final energy of 920 GeV. The proton storage ring used superconducting magnets to keep the protons on track.

The lepton beam in HERA became naturally transversely polarised through the Sokolov-Ternov effect. The characteristic build-up time expected for the HERA accelerator was approximately 40 minutes. Spin rotators on either side of the experiments changed the transverse polarisation of the beam into longitudinal polarisation. The positron beam polarisation was measured using two independent polarimeters, the transverse polarimeter (TPOL) and the longitudinal polarimeter (LPOL). Both devices exploit the spin-dependent cross section for Compton scattering of circularly polarised photons off positrons to measure the beam polarisation. The transverse polarimeter was upgraded in 2001 to provide a fast measurement for every positron bunch, and position-sensitive silicon strip and scintillating-fibre detectors were added to investigate systematic effects.

On 30 June 2007 at 11:23 pm, HERA was shut down, and dismantling of the four experiments started. HERA's main pre-accelerator PETRA was converted into a synchrotron radiation source, operating under the name PETRA-III since August 2010.

See also 
CLAS
LEPS
HERMES

References

External links 
  HERA Page at DESY

Buildings and structures in Altona, Hamburg
Education in Hamburg
Particle physics facilities